Prafulla Samantara (born 1952) is an Indian environmental activist from Odisha.

He has been a spokesperson for the Dangaria Kandha indigenous people, in their protest against plans for bauxite mining in the Niyamgiri hill range. A 2013 Supreme Court ruling stopped the mining plans. Samantara was awarded the Goldman Environmental Prize in 2017.

Bibliography

References 

1952 births
Living people
People from Odisha
Indian environmentalists
Goldman Environmental Prize awardees